Blagoevgrad Peninsula is the mostly ice-covered peninsula projecting 15 km in southeast direction from Oscar II Coast in Graham Land, Antarctica, and 17 km wide.  It is bounded by Vaughan Inlet to the north and Exasperation Inlet to the south, ending in Foyn Point to the southeast.  The east coast of the peninsula is indented by Yamforina Cove, and its interior is partly occupied by the southeast portion of Poibrene Heights.  It was formed as a result of the break-up of Larsen Ice Shelf in the area in 2002, and subsequent retreat of the adjacent Evans Glacier and Punchbowl Glacier.

The feature is named after the city of Blagoevgrad in southwestern Bulgaria.

Location
SCAR Antarctic Digital Database mapping in 2012.

Maps
 Antarctic Digital Database (ADD). Scale 1:250000 topographic map of Antarctica. Scientific Committee on Antarctic Research (SCAR), 1993–2016.

References
 Blagoevgrad Peninsula. SCAR Composite Antarctic Gazetteer.
 Bulgarian Antarctic Gazetteer. Antarctic Place-names Commission. (details in Bulgarian, basic data in English)

External links
 Blagoevgrad Peninsula. Copernix satellite image

Peninsulas of Graham Land
Oscar II Coast
Bulgaria and the Antarctic